Chengxian may refer to:

Cheng County, in Gansu, China
Chengxian Street, or Guozijian Street, in Beijing, China